Nazar Mahmud (born February 18, 1988, in the USSR) is an Israeli-Druze figure skater. His father is an Israeli-Druze from the Golan Heights, and his mother is a Ukrainian Christian. Mahmud was born while his family were living in the USSR. They moved to Israel soon after his birth. Mahmud is a three-season competitor on the Junior Grand Prix. He, along with younger brother Ruslan Mahmud, are the first Druze skaters to represent Israel internationally. Mahmud served in the Israeli Army.

Competitive highlights

 J = Junior level

References

External links
 

Israeli Druze
Israeli male single skaters
Druze sportspeople
1988 births
Living people
Israeli soldiers